The Aultman was a 1901 American automobile manufactured in Canton, Ohio; the light steam carriage, whose makers also built a four-wheel-drive steam truck, was built for only a few years.

History

By 1904, the Aultman Road Locomotive was advertised nationally in Dun's Review and was described as "specially designed for heavy hauling at mines, lumber camps, smelters, quarries, etc., and for contractors, road and irrigation work." It was also noted that it was suitable for freight lines from towns "off the railroads."

Advertisements

References

Steam road vehicles 
Steam cars
Veteran vehicles
Defunct motor vehicle manufacturers of the United States
Motor vehicle manufacturers based in Ohio
Defunct companies based in Ohio